Yevgeny Kafelnikov and Daniel Vacek were the defending champions, but lost in the quarterfinals to Karsten Braasch and Jim Grabb.

Tim Henman and Marc Rosset won the title by defeating Braasch and Grabb 7–6, 6–7, 7–6 in the final.

Seeds

Draw

Draw

References

External links
 Official results archive (ATP)
 Official results archive (ITF)

1997 ATP Tour
1997 Davidoff Swiss Indoors